Garam is a 2016 Indian Telugu-language action romantic comedy film starring Aadi Pudipeddi and Adah Sharma, written and directed by Madan Mohan Reddy, with cinematography by T. Surendra Reddy and produced by Saikumar. The film was released worldwide on 12 February 2016 and received mixed response from critics and audience. It was dubbed into Hindi under the same title.

Plot
Varala Babu (Aadi), who is poor at studies, would always face criticism from his father (Tanikella Bharani) and, he  is  jobless. He is asked to leave the house and challenges his father that he will prove to himself. He leaves for Hyderabad in search of a job, but he ends up falling in love with Sameera (Adah Sharma). In the process of wooing her, Varala Babu comes across Ravi (Chaitanya Krishna), a childhood rival of Babu in studies in a paralyzed and bedridden state in a hospital, and he saves Ravi from the baddies. Sameera is already facing an issue with Biju (Kabir Duhan Singh). Varala Babu is now left with a responsibility to save his friend and loved one from Biju.

Cast
 Aadi as Varala Babu
 Adah Sharma as Sameera
Kabir Duhan Singh as Biju
 Brahmanandam as Mr. Google 
 Posani Krishna Murali as Posani
 Satya Prakash
 Supreeth as Goon
 Chaitanya Krishna as Ravi
 Madhunandan as Bujji, Varalababu's friend
 Shakalaka Shankar as Varalababu's friend
 Nassar as Sameera's father
 Tanikella Bharani as Varala Babu's Father
 Naresh as Ravi's Father
 Vinaya Prasad as Ravi's mother
 Thagubothu Ramesh as Drunkard

Production
Saikumar produced the film. has stepped in to monitor the production activities of ‘Garam’ Starring his son Aadi in the lead role & the film is directed by Madan cinematography by T. Surendra Reddy. Writer Sreenivas Gavireddy penned the film’s script.

Soundtrack
The music was composed by Agasthya and released by Mango Music.

Release
Garam has been released on nearly 500 screens worldwide, which includes 360 screens in Andhra Pradesh and Telangana alongside Nani's Krishna Gaadi Veera Prema Gaadha

Box office
Garam grossed ₹3 crore on opening day at AP/Telangana box office and grossed ₹5 crore on its opening weekend

References

External links

 

2016 films
Indian interfaith romance films
2016 masala films
Indian action comedy films
Indian romantic action films
Indian romantic comedy films
2010s Telugu-language films
2016 romantic comedy films
2016 action comedy films